Oskar Albinus "Albin" Stenroos (24 February 1889 – 30 April 1971) was a Finnish runner, who won the marathon at the 1924 Olympics.

Stenroos ran his first marathon in 1909, placing third at the national championships, but then moved to shorter distances, down to 1500 m. His would run his next marathon 1924. In 1910 he won the 10,000 m race at the Finnish nationals. In absence of Hannes Kolehmainen, Stenroos won the national titles over 5000 m and 10,000 m from 1912 to 1916 and the cross country title in 1915–1917.

At the 1912 Summer Olympics, Stenroos won the bronze medal over 10,000 m behind Kolehmainen. He also finished sixth in the cross country and aided his team to a second place. In 1915, he ran his first world record over 30 km (1:48:06.2), which he improved in 1924 (1:46:11.6). He also held the 20 km world record in 1923 (1:07:11.2). He skipped the 1920 Summer Olympics, but decided to run the marathon in 1924. He won the race in hot conditions, beating second-placed Romeo Bertini by almost six minutes. He placed second at the 1926 Boston Marathon, and retired after failing to finish in 1927.

References

1889 births
1971 deaths
People from Vehmaa
Finnish male long-distance runners
Finnish male marathon runners
Olympic athletes of Finland
Athletes (track and field) at the 1912 Summer Olympics
Athletes (track and field) at the 1924 Summer Olympics
Olympic gold medalists for Finland
Olympic silver medalists for Finland
Olympic bronze medalists for Finland
Medalists at the 1924 Summer Olympics
Medalists at the 1912 Summer Olympics
Olympic gold medalists in athletics (track and field)
Olympic silver medalists in athletics (track and field)
Olympic bronze medalists in athletics (track and field)
Olympic cross country runners
Sportspeople from Southwest Finland